The Diocese of Baguio (Latin: Dioecesis Baghiopolitana) is a Latin Church suffragan diocese in the ecclesiastical province of the Metropolitan Archdiocese of Nueva Segovia on Luzon island in the Philippines.
 
Its see is Our Lady of Atonement Cathedral in Baguio, Benguet, Cordillera Administrative Region.

The Bishop of Baguio is Victor Bendico who was enthroned in 2017 to replace Emeritus Bishop Carlito "Otto" J. Cenzon on January 10, 2017.

History 

The Diocese is one of the oldest ecclesiastical territories in the Philippines. It was established as the Apostolic Prefecture of Mountain Province (Latin: Praefectura Apostolica Montana) on July 15, 1932. The territory that the Diocese of Baguio now spans was split from the bishopric of Nueva Segovia.

On June 10, 1948, the apostolic prefecture was elevated to the Apostolic Vicariate of Mountain Province (Montañosa), entitling it to a titular bishop. The prefecture received a papal visit from John Paul II in February 1981.

In 1992, the prefecture was renamed the Apostolic Vicariate of Baguio, after ceding territories to form the Apostolic Vicariate of Bontoc-Lagawe and the Apostolic Vicariate of Tabuk.

On June 24, 2004, the prefecture became the Diocese of Baguio, losing its missionary pre-diocesan status and becoming a suffragan of its mother Archdiocese of Nueva Segovia.

Ordinaries and auxiliary episcopate 
These ordinaries are all Latin Rite clergy, who are mostly members of missionary congregations.

Apostolic Prefect of Mountain Province

Apostolic Vicar of Mountain Province (Montañosa)

Apostolic Vicars

Bishops

Auxiliary Bishop

See also 
 Catholic Church in the Philippines
 List of Catholic dioceses in the Philippines
 Our Lady of Covadonga

References

Sources and external links
 GCatholic with incumbent biography links

Roman Catholic dioceses in the Philippines
Roman Catholic Ecclesiastical Province of Nueva Segovia
Baguio
Religion in Benguet
Christian organizations established in 1932
Roman Catholic dioceses and prelatures established in the 20th century